Stanes Schools are two schools in Coimbatore and Coonoor.

History

The schools were established by Sir Robert Stanes in 1862, with the Coimbatore branch starting with four children and two teachers.It started as a European and Eurasian school but under the concept of liberal education the restrictions have been relaxed, but minority rights for Anglo-Indian children are still retained.

Foundation

Sir Robert Stanes (born 13 May 1841) laid the foundation stone of the school on 6 November 1862 when the school had four children and two teachers. The British Empire conferred on him The Kaiser-i-Hind Medal for his Meritorious Services. It started as a European And Eurasian School but later it was opened to all irrespective of their creed, community and status. Exclusive minority rights for Anglo-Indian children are retained as per Sir Robert's wishes.

Houses
The boys and girls are grouped into four houses. Each house is headed by its own Master and Mistress and its Captains, Prefects, and Vice-Captains. The houses are:

Coimbatore School
Lordly Lions, motto: Animo et Fide, red
Playful Panthers, motto: Nil Desperandum, blue
Terrific Tigers, motto: Spring to Victory, yellow
Wily Wolves, motto: Fide et Labore, green

Coonoor School
Davids - yellow
Fritchley - red
Groves - green
Stanes - blue

Inter-house sports and games are conducted. The house which emerges victorious is awarded the Champion House trophy. There are trophies for the cross country race and marching. The Annual Sports Day is an important event.

Notable alumni
Parvez Dewan- Tourism Secretary of India, IAS; Advisor (cabinet minister), J&K; founder Indpaedia
Nirupama Rao  - Foreign Secretary of India, IFS
Narain Karthikeyan - F1 (First Indian), A1GP and NASCAR racing driver
Adam Sinclair  - Indian field hockey player
Arvind Krishna - CEO, IBM.
Mahesh Bhupathi - Indian Tennis Player
P. R. Krishna Kumar
Narayan Jagadeesan - Indian Cricketer, Chennai Super Kings, IPL (T20)

References

External links

Stanes School, Coimbatore
Stanes School, Coonoor

High schools and secondary schools in Tamil Nadu
Schools in Coimbatore
Coonoor
Educational institutions established in 1858
1858 establishments in British India
1858 establishments in India